Hoka One One (stylized as HOKA) is an athletic shoe company originating in Annecy, France that designs and markets running shoes. The brand first gained attention in the running industry by producing shoes with oversized outsoles, dubbed "maximalist" shoes due to extra cushion; this was in contrast to the minimalist shoes trend that was gaining popularity at the time of the company's founding in 2009.

Hoka produces both low-profile and max-cushion shoes for road, trail, and all-terrain; throughout its product line, Hoka shoes retain features like a low weight-to-cushion ratio and midsole and outsole geometry designed to promote inherent stability and an efficient stride.

The company was founded in 2009 in Annecy, France; it has been based in Richmond, California and its corporate headquarters are currently in Goleta, California. The company operates as subsidiary of Deckers Brands. The Brand President is Wendy Yang, who serves as President of the Deckers Performance Lifestyle Group, which includes the brands Teva and Sanuk.

History

The company was founded by Nicolas Mermoud and Jean-Luc Diard, former Salomon employees, in 2009, when they sought to design a shoe that allowed them to run downhill faster, and created a model with an oversized outsole that had more cushion than other running shoes at the time. The shoes are named after the Māori language phrase loosely meaning "fly over the earth".

The shoes were initially embraced by ultramarathon runners due to their enhanced cushion and inherent stability; however, they quickly gained popularity among other runners for offering maximum cushion and minimal weight. The brand's original, highest-cushion models  are now accompanied in the Hoka lineup by lighter-weight shoes that retain much of the brand's signature cushion, and even lightweight training and racing shoes  and track spikes.

Hoka was purchased on April 1, 2013 by Deckers Brands, the parent company for UGG, Teva and other footwear brands.

The company sponsors a variety of professional runners; its first athletes were primarily trail-ultra runners, but their roster has expanded to include several track & field, triathlon, and road-running athletes. 
Hoka also has long-term sponsorship deals with the professional training groups Northern Arizona Elite, based in Flagstaff, Arizona; and the California-based Aggies Running Club. Hoka is also the former sponsor of the New Jersey New York Track Club.

See also
 Speedgoat

References

External links
 

Athletic shoe brands
Companies based in Richmond, California
Māori words and phrases
Shoe companies of the United States
Sportswear brands